Republic Square (Respublika Alañy), also known as Independence Square or New Square is the main square in Almaty, Kazakhstan. It is used for public events. The former presidential palace, now used as municipal offices, is on its south side.

History
The area was created by the decision of the First Secretary of the Central Committee of Communist Party of Kazakhstan Dinmukhamed Kunayev, since an increase in population of the city, the Lenin Square during festival events could not accommodate all the residents of the city. The area opened in 1980 under the name Brezhnev Square (after Leonid Brezhnev) in honor of the 60th Anniversary of the founding of the Kazakh Republic. It has become the main square of the capital of Kazakhstan and  until the collapse of the Soviet Union it was a place for mass demonstrations, celebrations, festivals, military parades, rallies, festivals. The area was planted with deciduous and coniferous trees. In 1981, Kunayev and party workers planted 70 Tien Shan firs  along the walkway area.

In 1982, the authors of the square, for the second and last time in the history of Kazakh architecture, received the State Prize of the USSR in the field of architecture.

In 1986, an infamous uprising known as Jeltoqsan occurred in the square. Where a group of crowd gathered to protest over Kunayev's dismissal. The events lasted from 16 December until 19 December 1986. The protests began in the morning of 17 December, as a student demonstration attracted thousands of participants as they marched through Brezhnev Square across to the CPK Central Committee building. As the result, internal troops and OMON forces entered the city, violence erupted throughout the city which around 200 people were killed.

In 1992, the basic, most important and favorite holiday was celebrated in the square. For the first time began to celebrate Nauryz. Unlike before, during Perestroika where the holiday was only allowed to celebrate at the Lenin Square. Every year on 22 March, from morning to midnight thousands of Almaty residents came to the square to celebrate the national holiday of the vernal equinox - Nauryz. In the square, every year on March 22, tents were put out, which sold baursaks, leather, rice and soft drinks. Festive concerts were also held by famous Kazakh stars. 

Parades in honor of the 50th anniversary of the victory in the Second World War and the 5th anniversary of the Independence of Kazakhstan took place on the square on 9 May 1995 and 16 December 1996 respectively.

In 2007, the square began construction of underground shopping and entertainment center, which demolished granite platform. Because of the construction zone, 60% of the area was closed by a fence, a large number of the Tien Shan fir trees were cut down, the movement of vehicles became limited. Before 2012, a symbol of independence for all Kazakhs - the Republic Square was disfigured by pits and wells. Residents negatively reacted to the construction, as the celebration of Nauryz was impossible for it to be held.

In 2012, the construction of the underground shopping center was finally over, however the celebration of Nauryz was still restricted until 2014 which the celebration was finally allowed.

During the Bloody January unrest in 2022, the mayor's offices that were located on the Republic Square were raided by protesters with the building being set on fire. It has been announced that instead of rebuilding the office, it will be demolished and an amusement park will be built instead.

List of architectural monuments

The area previously had a status of state monuments of architecture and urban planning. In 2015, it was ruled into the State list of historical and cultural monuments of local importance in Almaty.

 Akimat of Almaty Residence (the former Communist Party of Kazakhstan)
 Residence of the First President of Kazakhstan (former Presidential Palace of Kazakhstan from 1991-1997)
 Republican Schoolchildren's Palace (the former Republican Palace of Pioneers)
 Independence Monument
 Tagzym Memorial

Name
From 1980, the area was named as New Square, in 1982 the area was renamed to Brezhnev Square as a tribute to the death of Leonid Brezhnev. On April 1, 1988 a published decree of the Central Committee of the CPSU, the Presidium of the USSR Supreme Soviet and the USSR Council of Ministers changed the name from Leonid Brezhnev back to New Square again. On May 23, 1990, the Supreme Council of the Kazakh Soviet Socialist Republic adopted a resolution to rename New Square to Republic Square.

Gallery

Notes

References

External links 
 Webcam on the Republic Square
 A 1980 military parade on the square in honor of the 60th anniversary of the Kazakh SSR

Almaty
National squares
Squares in Almaty
Tourism in Almaty
Buildings and structures in Almaty